Hile is a hill town located in the Eastern Part of  Nepal, 13 km north of the regional center of Dhankuta Bazar. At an elevation of 1948 meters, it is the main route to other hilly districts like Bhojpur and Sankhuwasabha.

The shops and restaurants primarily serve the local economy. Hile Bazar is one of the largest in the area, attracting locals from villages in the surrounding hills. The only businesses that target tourists are lodges. Hile Bazar is one of the major religious, cultural, and tourist centers of the Dhankuta district.

Transportation
One can reach Hile by easily accessible public vehicles or from their own private vehicle too. The major transportation is the public bus that is available from Dharan to the Southern part of Eastern Nepal and is the gateway to different districts of the hilly region. Numerous microbuses and small vehicles such as a van, taxi, and auto-rickshaw are easily available to go Hile Bazar.

Facilities
Hile is normally famous for Tongba and Sukuti to represent it, visitors are welcomed by a big statue of tongba in the station. Bazar consists of different kinds of hotels, clinics, utensil shops, gas stations, fancy stores, and educational institutions. As a tourism area, local people welcome everyone.

Gallery

References

Dhankuta District